The Forced March is a 2003 Russian action war film directed by Nikolai Stambula.

Plot 
The film tells about a pupil of an orphanage who wants to go to war in Chechnya. He is undergoing training and is being included in the elite special forces. Ahead of him there will be many trials, but he will adhere to his principles to the end.

Cast 
 Vladimir Volga as Aleksandr
 Olga Chursina as Masha
 Evgeniy Kosyrev as Volodya
 Fyodor Smirnov as Hasan
 Aleksandr Baluev	
 Vitaliy Vashedskiy

References

External links 
 

2003 films
2000s Russian-language films
Russian action war films
2000s action war films